HVCC may refer to:

 Hudson Valley Community College, college in New York, USA
 Home valuation code of conduct, American document
 Hunter Valley Coal Chain, Australian mining chain
 Hope Valley Cricket Club, sporting club based in Adelaide, South Australia.